Emiliano Hebert Coitiño Dondan (born 29 April 1998) is a Uruguayan footballer who plays as a forward for Montevideo Wanderers F.C. in the Uruguayan Primera División.

References

External links

1998 births
Living people
Uruguayan footballers
Association football forwards
Montevideo Wanderers F.C. players
Villa Española players
Uruguayan Primera División players
Uruguayan Segunda División players